USS LST-317 was one of 390 tank landing ships (LSTs) built for the United States Navy during World War II.

LST-317 was laid down on 15 October 1942 at the New York Navy Yard; launched on 28 January 1943; sponsored by Mrs. Florence Whitehouse; and commissioned on 6 February 1943.

Service history
During World War II, LST-317 was assigned to the European theater and participated in the Sicilian occupation (July 1943), Salerno landings (September 1943), and Invasion of Normandy (June 1944).

Upon her return to the United States, she was decommissioned on 18 May 1945 for conversion to landing craft repair ship USS Conus (ARL-44) at the New York Navy Yard. The conversion was canceled 12 September 1945 and the ship reverted to LST-317; she was struck from the Naval Vessel Register on 12 March 1946. On 22 January 1947 the tank landing ship was sold to A. G. Schoonmaker for scrapping.
 
LST-317 earned three battle stars for World War II service.

See also
 List of United States Navy LSTs

References

 
 

World War II amphibious warfare vessels of the United States
Ships built in Brooklyn
1943 ships
LST-1-class tank landing ships of the United States Navy